Liu Jing (born 11 December 1987 in Shandong) is a Chinese rower.

References 
 

1987 births
Living people
Chinese female rowers
Rowers from Shandong
Asian Games medalists in rowing
Rowers at the 2010 Asian Games
World Rowing Championships medalists for China
Asian Games gold medalists for China
Medalists at the 2010 Asian Games